Bani Saleh Rural District is a rural district (dehestan) in Neysan District, Hoveyzeh County, Khuzestan Province, Iran. At the 2006 census, its population was 2,718, in 488 families.  The rural district has 12 villages.

References 

Rural Districts of Khuzestan Province
Hoveyzeh County